Prabhunath Singh is a politician from Bihar, India and was a member of the 12th, 13th and 14th Lok Sabha. Singh represented the Masrakh assembly constituency from 1985 to 1995, and the Maharajganj Lok Sabha constituency of Bihar from 1998 to 2009. In 2013, he won the bypoll and remained as MP until 2014. Singh is a member of the Rashtriya Janata Dal (RJD).

Background family and education 
Singh was born in Mashrakh, Saran district, Bihar. He studied until class-12 from Bihar University, Muzaffarpur in 1972. His brothers Dina Singh, Madan Singh and Kedar Singh are also politicians. He is married to Binda Devi. His son, Randhir Kumar Singh, is also a politician and lost in the 2019 Indian general election to Janardan Singh Sigriwal of the Bharatiya Janata Party (BJP).

Career 
Before entering into politics, Singh owned a brick-making factory. He won his first election for MLA as an independent candidate due to his support among Rajputs from his area. He is a four time member of parliament from the Saran district. In the 1995 elections, he ran as a member of BJP, but left for the Janata Dal (United) (JD(U)) party after losing. Singh won election as a member of the JD(U) party, but  later joined RJD due to dictatorship of Nitish Kumar in JD(U). He represented the Maharajganj constituency of Bihar from 2004 to 2009 on the JD(U) ticket. In 2009, he contested on the JD(U) ticket, but narrowly lost to Uma Shankar Singh of RJD. After the death of Uma Shankar Singh, whose seat was now vacant, Singh contested on the RJD ticket, defeating JD(U)'s nominee P.K. Shahi.

Conviction and controversies 
On 23 May 2017, Singh was sentenced to life imprisonment by the Hazaribagh Court for his connection with the murder of MLA Ashok Singh 22 years prior.

Positions held 
Prabhunath Singh had been elected as MLA twice, and as Lok Sabha MP four times.

References 

Home Page on the Parliament of India's Website

1953 births
Living people
India MPs 1998–1999
India MPs 1999–2004
India MPs 2004–2009
India MPs 2009–2014
Indian politicians convicted of crimes
Indian prisoners sentenced to life imprisonment
Janata Dal politicians
Janata Dal (United) politicians
Lok Sabha members from Bihar
People from Bihar
People from Chhapra
Politicians convicted of murder
Rashtriya Janata Dal politicians
Samata Party politicians
United Progressive Alliance candidates in the 2014 Indian general election